Donald L. Patrick is a social scientist, academic, and an author. He is a Professor Emeritus of Health Systems and Population Health at the University of Washington, Director of Seattle Quality of Life Group, and Creator of the Biobehavioral Cancer Prevention and Control Training Program jointly with the Fred Hutchinson Cancer Center. He has served as the co-chair of the Cochrane Collaboration's Patient Reported Outcomes Methods Group. His research interests revolve around various aspects of public health which integrate the themes from fields such as psychological intervention, social stratification, public health, and quality of life. Much of his research works have focused on outcomes research on vulnerable populations, health disparities, and end-of-life-care.

Patrick has published five books including, Long-term Effects of War-Related Deprivation on Health: A Report on the Evidence, Health Status and Health Policy: Quality of Life in Health Care Evaluation and Resource Allocation, and Hope or Hype: The Obsession with Medical Advances and the High Cost of False Promises.

Patrick is a Member of the US National Academy of Medicine, and was the First President of International Society for Quality of Life Research. He was the Associate Editor of Quality of Life Research.

Education
Patrick graduated from the Northwestern University with a major in Psychology in 1966. Subsequently, he attended Columbia University, completed his MSPH degree in 1968, and graduated with a Ph.D. degree in Public Health in 1972.

Career
Patrick started his academic career as a Research Sociologist at the New York University (NYU) and later joined the University of California, and helped to develop the Quality of well-being index, and general health policy model. Subsequently, he held an appointment as a lecturer of Public Health, and Instructor for Sociology of Medical Care in the Department of Epidemiology and Public Health and Institution for Social and Policy Studies at Yale University. He then moved to the United Kingdom where he was at St Thomas's Hospital Medical School, and served as Senior Lecturer at University of London between 1976 and 1982. Afterwards, he joined the Department of Social Medicine at the University of North Carolina as an associate professor from between 1982 until 1987. He has held appointments as Professor at the School of Public Health, School of Medicine, and the Department of Sociology at the University of Washington. As of 2000, he has been an Adjunct Professor in the Department of Rehabilitation Medicine and School of Pharmacy, and is now the Emeritus Professor of Department of Health Systems and Population Health School of Public Health at the University of Washington. He was also the Full Member of Fred Hutchinson Cancer Research Center from 1988 until 2019.

Patrick has held several administrative appointments throughout his career. He was the first Director of Program in Social and Behavioral Sciences in the School of Public Health at the University of Washington and held this appointment from 1987 until 2006. He headed the Social Science Section at the University of London from 1977 until 1982, and has directed the Bio behavioral Cancer Prevention and Control Training Program, and Seattle Quality of Life Group at the University of Washington.

Patrick held an appointment as Medical Assistant at the McKenzie-Willamette Medical Center, and Sacred Heart Medical Center in Oregon between 1962, and 1966. After that, at Columbia University, he undertook internship at Montefiore Hospital and Medical Center in New York, and served as an Administrative Intern. Later on, he also held an appointment as a Senior Health Planner at the New York State Executive Department at the Health Planning Commission in New York. He was the Associate Chair for Research in the Department of Health Systems and Population Health between 2016, and 2019 at University of Washington.

Research
Patrick has published more than 500 papers. His research spans the fields of public health, chronic illness, public health policy, outcomes research, quality of life, health status assessment with a particular emphasis on vulnerable populations, health promotion, and health disparities. One of his earliest papers entitled, "Toward an operational definition of health" is widely cited.

Health status assessment and quality of life
Patrick's research on health status assessment has had significant implications in the fields of public health, health policy, and quality of life. He is best known for his contribution to the development of Quality of well-being index, World Health Organization Quality of Life assessment (the WHOQOL) settings, and numerous disease specific quality of life measures. He conducted a 10-year program of research in Lambeth in London on the care of persons with physical disabilities culminating in a series of papers and a book. While exploring the varied aspects of quality of life (QOL) and health status assessment, he partook in a WHO project focused on the development of QOL measuring instrument with evident reliability, validity, and pertinence to diverse cultural settings. The particular features of the planned instrument (WHOQOL), and the study protocol was reported in 1993. Later on, in a 1998 research paper by WHOQOL Group, the successfully developed final-trial version of instrument entitled, "WHOQOL-100". The research findings also suggested that the said instrument presented psychometric properties applicable to multi-cultural settings. He has also focused his research on assessing the health status among older adults, and revealed that Rapid Assessment of Physical Activity (RAPA) serves as an appropriate, and valid measure of physical activity, and thus, the RAPA self-report questionnaires can be used in clinical settings. While investigating the community functioning of individuals suffering from Schizophrenia, his research highlighted that although behavioral assessment and clinician ratings can be efficient for the clinical trials, there is still a need for the development of adequate valid and reliable instruments. In addition to that, he addressed that an objective standard of community functioning also created a hurdle in the formulation of instruments for the assessing community functioning. Since, health-related quality of life (HRQL) measurement is considered vital for guiding patient care and policy choices, as recognized by clinicians and decision-makers alike. It has also been explained that for the (HRQL) measures to be easily comprehended by the clinicians, and policymakers alike so as they can analyze score differences, and achieve meaningful outputs. He specified two primary approaches regarding the measurement of QOL which includes, generic and specific instruments that differ in their potential to either indicate general HRQL or target specific disease and patient group respectively. It has also been demonstrated with his research works how the assessment of QOL regarding health in the clinical practice can lead to myriad benefits including, disease prevention, reduction in pain or discomfort symptoms, avoidance of complications, with a goal to promote a prolonged life.

Patrick was a Special Government Employee for 10 years working on and culminating in the publication on the Food and Drug Administration Guidance on the Use of Patient Reported Outcomes in Medical Product Evaluation and labeling.

Patrick has focused his research on evaluating the quality of death, and exploring the measure of the quality of the dying. In one of his research studies conducted in 2002, he designed and supervised after-death interviews with the family members of the deceased since the research findings can be utilized for the improvement of near-death care, and experience of the dying patients. With the qualitative data from individuals with and without chronic as well as terminal diseases, he also performed evaluation of quality of dying and death. Furthermore, he has also looked into the barriers associated with the communication of end-of-life-care with the acquired immune deficiency syndromes (AIDS) patients, and how the interventions concentrated on the communication could be facilitated. His research has also laid a particular emphasis on increasing awareness of not even identifying but also explaining the cancer-related distress. A conference reported that the before employing the treatment interventions, assessment must be carried out focused on the symptom, pain, depression, and fatigue management in cancer patients. According to the research findings, clinicians should rely on brief assessment tools to examine and continuously discuss the symptom management with the patients. In addition to that, the key factors which may influence the cancer-related distress, and symptom management including limited knowledge, and effectiveness of the treatment interventions have been addressed by his research as well.

Patrick's research concentrated on the chronic illnesses has explored the dynamics of health services use on the chronic health conditions. The inattention to the non-fatal diseases in the health care services have been identified, specifically in young adults and primarily corresponds to their prevalence. Based on a self-report questionnaire results by adults with chronic conditions, improved functional status with the presence of fewer depressive symptoms, leads to better quality of life. However, it was emphasized that this strong association between functional status and quality of life exhibits difference exists across different populations.

Outcomes research
Patrick is most known for his work on outcomes research which covers a broad range of aspects, particularly focused on vulnerable populations, chronic illness, as well as end of life care. In a Delphi study featuring a collaboration with public health experts, a consensus was reached between experts over the taxonomy, and terminology of the measures aimed at patient-reported outcomes (PRO) based on health. Having focused on the PRO, he also determined the content validity on the PRO instruments aimed for the use in medical product evaluation. Moreover, the evaluation of clinically significant differences for QOL outcomes has been characterized by him as well.
The research findings of in-depth analysis of quality adjusted life years (QALYs) illustrated that patients with clinically significant depressive symptoms reflect significantly lower QALY, when compared to non-depressed individuals. The need to improve care for depressed adult patients aged more than 65 has been demonstrated in his research as well.
Whereas, in a LIDO Study focused on the depression outcomes in patients from a culturally diverse primary health care setting, it was revealed that higher depressive symptoms scores were found to be linked with poor health, poor quality of life, and an increased use of health care services, with no particular association to the demographic variables. The probability of relying on depression treatment intervention was marked by distinct health perceptions, as well as the severity of depression.

Ray Moynihan reviewed Richard Deyo and Patrick's book Hope or Hype: The Obsession with Medical Advances and the High Cost of False Promises and wrote that it is, "Packed full of powerful examples, and destined to serve as a reference book for future generations of students…", but called the appraisal of commercially driven medicine unnecessary, and said that that focus needs to shifted upon the how to solve the dilemma of excess of profitable medicines rather than just its diagnosis. Simon Chapman was of the view that the book would not be well received by many of the conference delegates, and they could consider it, "a catalog of profanity." Chapman commended the book stating that, "This is a scholarly, thoroughly referenced, and entirely accessible book that deserves to be read...", and regarded the lack of inclusion of the international perspective on how various governments have tried to change the poor use of medical resource, a key shortcoming of the book. However, considering the book a classic exposition, he added that, "Except for this parochialism, it… deserves a wide readership."

Kaplan in the book review of Health Status and Health Policy: Quality of Life in Health Care Evaluation and Resource Allocation authored by Patrick, and Pennifer Erickson reported that the book "highlights the issues associated with applying utility-based measures, and explains the steps involved in conducting cost-utility analysis."

Awards and honors
1966 – Departmental Honors in Psychology, Northwestern University
1991 – President's Excellence Award, Spina Bifida Association of America
1993 – Elected Inaugural President, International Society for Quality of Life Research
1993 – The Cecil G. Sheps Distinguished Investigator Award, University of North Carolina at Chapel Hill
1995 – Elected to Membership in National Academy of Medicine, National Academy of Sciences
1996 – Elected Fellow of Association for Health Services Research
2001 – Senior Health Policy Investigator Award, Robert Wood Johnson Foundation
2001 – President's Award, International Society for Quality of Life Research 
2002 – Most Cited Social Scientists in the United States
2002 – Who's Who in America
2012 – Board, Washington State Academy of Sciences
2012 – Avedis Donabedian Lifetime Achievement Award, International Society for Pharmacoeconomics and Outcomes Research

Personal life
Patrick has two children with his wife, Shirley A. A. Beresford, who is also a Professor Emeritus at the University of Washington.

Bibliography

Books
Long-Term Effects of War-Related Deprivation On Health: A Report On The Evidence (1981)
Sociology as Applied To Medicine (1982) 
Disablement in The Community (1989) 
Health Status and Health Policy: Quality of Life in Health Care Evaluation and Resource Allocation (1993) 
Hope or Hype: The Obsession With Medical Advances and The High Cost of False Promises (2005)

Selected articles
Patrick, D. L., & Deyo, R. A. (1989). Generic and disease-specific measures in assessing health status and quality of life. Medical care, S217-S232.
Patrick, D. L., & Erickson, P. (1993). Health status and health policy: quality of life in health care evaluation and resource allocation.
Guyatt, G. H., Feeny, D. H., & Patrick, D. L. (1993). Measuring health-related quality of life. Annals of internal medicine, 118(8), 622–629.
Patrick, D. L., Cheadle, A., Thompson, D. C., Diehr, P., Koepsell, T., & Kinne, S. (1994). The validity of self-reported smoking: a review and meta-analysis. American journal of public health, 84(7), 1086–1093.
Andresen, E. M., Malmgren, J. A., Carter, W. B., & Patrick, D. L. (1994). Screening for depression in well older adults: Evaluation of a short form of the CES-D. American journal of preventive medicine, 10(2), 77–84.
Mokkink, L. B., Terwee, C. B., Patrick, D. L., Alonso, J., Stratford, P. W., Knol, D. L., ... & de Vet, H. C. (2010). The COSMIN study reached international consensus on taxonomy, terminology, and definitions of measurement properties for health-related patient-reported outcomes. Journal of clinical epidemiology, 63(7), 737-745.
Mokkink, L. B., Terwee, C. B., Patrick, D. L., Alonso, J., Stratford, P. W., Knol, D. L., ... & De Vet, H. C. (2010). The COSMIN checklist for assessing the methodological quality of studies on measurement properties of health status measurement instruments: an international Delphi study. Quality of life research, 19(4), 539–549.

References 

Living people
Year of birth missing (living people)
Northwestern University alumni
Columbia University Mailman School of Public Health alumni